Chromolaena impetiolaris  is a rare Caribbean species of flowering shrub in the family Asteraceae. It is found only the Island of Dominica in the Lesser Antilles.

Chromolaena impetiolaris is a shrub lacking hairs on its herbage. It has opposite leaves with no petioles but with numerous small glands on the blades. Flower heads are displayed in a flat-topped array.

References

impetiolaris
Flora of Dominica
Plants described in 1861